Nildo Victor Juffo (born 24 February 1993) is a Brazilian footballer who plays as a midfielder for Koper.

Career

In 2012, Juffo was sent on loan to the youth academy of São Paulo, one of Brazil's most successful clubs.

Before the second half of 2014/15, he signed for Shkëndija in North Macedonia, where he suffered a ligament injury.

In 2017, Juffo signed for Albanian club Flamurtari, where he claimed the football was defensive, and did not receive his salary for 6 months, and made 26 appearances and scored 4 goals.

In 2018, Juffo signed for Vardar, the most successful team in Macedonia.

Before the 2019 season, he signed for Indonesian outfit Semen Padang, where he suffered an injury.

Before the 2020 season, Juffo signed for Vitória-ES in the Brazilian fourth division.

Before the second half of 2020/21, he signed for Slovenian side Koper.

References

External links
 
 

Brazilian footballers
Living people
1993 births
Association football midfielders
Macedonian First Football League players
Brazilian expatriates in Indonesia
Brazilian expatriate footballers
Expatriate footballers in Slovenia
Expatriate footballers in North Macedonia
Expatriate footballers in Albania
Expatriate footballers in Indonesia
Kategoria Superiore players
FK Vardar players
KF Shkëndija players
Flamurtari FC players
Campeonato Brasileiro Série D players
FC Koper players
Vitória Futebol Clube (ES) players
Sportspeople from Espírito Santo